Mahmoud Pak Niat (born 31 December 1952) is an Iranian actor. He is best known for his acting in Once Upon a Time (1991), Patriarch (1994) After the Rain (2001), Tenth Night (2002), Prophet Joseph (2008–2009) and Shahrzad (2015–2016) television series. He has received various accolades, including nominations for two Crystal Simorgh and a Hafez Award.

Career
Mahmoud Pakniyyat began stage acting in 1969 and in 1988 he stepped into the world of movies and television.

The series which brought him a nationwide fame was Once Upon a Time (1991–1992).

His popularity grew with his appearance in the series The Patriarch (1993–1995) and After the Rain (2000).

Pakniyyat has appeared in the series such as Sheikh Mofid (1995), Seasoned Rider (1997), Lighter than Darkness (1999–2002), The Tenth Night (2001), Prophet Joseph (2008), Building No.85 (2010), Behind the Tall Mountains (2012), The Line (2014), The Recluse (2014), and Warm Breath (2015).

He has also acted in a number of movies, including Death Formation (1994), Land of the Sun (1996), The World Upside-Down (1997), The Wrong Guy (1998), The Victorious Warrior (1998), The Deserted Station (2000–2001), City of Chaos (2005), Heartbroken (2008), and Extreme Cold (2009).

Iranian Ministry of Culture and Islamic Guidance has awarded Iran's High Distinction in Art to Pakniyyat.

Personal life
Mahmoud Pakniat married an actress. They have 2 sons together.

Filmography

Film

Web

Television

References

External links

Iranian male actors
Pak Niat,Mahmoud
Living people
Iranian male television actors
1952 births
21st-century Iranian male actors